Hypocrita excellens is a moth of the family Erebidae. It was described by Francis Walker in 1854. It is found in Venezuela and Guatemala.

References

 

Hypocrita
Moths described in 1854